= Kadhim Aboud =

Iraqi association football player (1948–2018)

Personal information
- Full name: Kadhim Aboud
- Date of birth: 1 July 1948
- Place of birth: Iraq
- Date of death: 12 July 2018 (aged 70)
- Position: Midfielder

International career
Years	Team	Apps	(Gls)
1969–1970	Iraq		

Kadhim Aboud (Arabic: كَاظِم عَبُّود; 1 July 1948 – 12 July 2018) was an Iraqi football midfielder who played for Iraq between 1969 and 1970.

On 11 July 2018, Aboud died at the age of 70.
